An antibody is a type of protein used by the immune system.

Antibody or antibodies may also refer to:

 Antibodies (film), a 2005 German film
 Antibody (film),  2002 science fiction film
 "Antibodies", a 2000 short science fiction story by Charles Stross